Golflands is an eastern suburb of the city of Auckland, New Zealand. The Pakuranga Golf Club is part of the suburb, and many of the streets have names related to golf or notable golf players, such as Bob Charles drive. The golf club was formed in 1969 on leased farmland, which it purchased in 1974 and sold on to Pakuranga Country Club. In 2012, part of the land was sold to Elim Christian College to provide playing fields for their Golflands campus. Another part of the golf course was developed as a retirement home in 2020.

The area is bounded by Cascades Drive on the north, Botany Road on the east, Te Rakau Drive on the south, and Pakuranga Stream on the west.

Demographics

Golflands had a population of 2,460 at the 2018 New Zealand census, an increase of 87 people (3.7%) since the 2013 census, and an increase of 72 people (3.0%) since the 2006 census. There were 873 households, comprising 1,188 males and 1,272 females, giving a sex ratio of 0.93 males per female. The median age was 43.2 years (compared with 37.4 years nationally), with 390 people (15.9%) aged under 15 years, 435 (17.7%) aged 15 to 29, 1,188 (48.3%) aged 30 to 64, and 450 (18.3%) aged 65 or older.

Ethnicities were 54.6% European/Pākehā, 4.3% Māori, 3.4% Pacific peoples, 40.7% Asian, and 4.3% other ethnicities. People may identify with more than one ethnicity.

The percentage of people born overseas was 52.9, compared with 27.1% nationally.

Although some people chose not to answer the census's question about religious affiliation, 41.8% had no religion, 41.3% were Christian, 3.5% were Hindu, 2.4% were Muslim, 3.8% were Buddhist and 2.7% had other religions.

Of those at least 15 years old, 567 (27.4%) people had a bachelor's or higher degree, and 252 (12.2%) people had no formal qualifications. The median income was $35,500, compared with $31,800 nationally. 447 people (21.6%) earned over $70,000 compared to 17.2% nationally. The employment status of those at least 15 was that 1,062 (51.3%) people were employed full-time, 246 (11.9%) were part-time, and 75 (3.6%) were unemployed.

References

Suburbs of Auckland
Howick Local Board Area